Peter David William Wright (born 11 March 1943) is an Australian born Squash Champion and sports administrator/entrepreneur.

Wright won the World Masters Squash Championships three times. In addition, he has been Australian, New Zealand and Victorian Masters Squash Champion.

Described as an “outstanding administrator", he was Tournament Director for the 1995 and 2001 World Masters Squash Championships held in Melbourne, and, inter alia, for the  Australian Masters Squash Association and the Victorian Masters Squash Association.

Early life
Wright was born in Sunshine, Victoria in the middle of World War II. His father, David Stanley Wright was a munitions worker and his mother was Lorna Edna Wright (nee Martin). His life time sports career began in his home suburb of Sunshine where he played in many junior competitive sports. At 15 he joined the Sunshine Park Tennis Club and sometime before 1962 the Sunshine Squash Club. Wright suffered “terribly” from asthma as a youngster, but his asthma went away when he began playing squash.

Kerville states that Wright has always believed deeply in the benefits of sport for every human being. Wright further believes that all persons, including lower grades and "oldies", particularly benefit from the competitive and social side of squash and any kind of sport.

Sporting career
Peter Wright has been three times World Masters Squash Champion. His victories were in 1985 in Toronto, Canada, in 1993  in the over 50s division in Edinburgh, Scotland, and in 1999 in the over 55 division Sheffield, England. He was runner-up in 1989 in Arhus in Denmark, in 1994 in Brisbane, Australia, in 1995 and 2001 in Melbourne, Australia.

 Australian Masters Squash Champion five times.
 Australian Masters Games Squash Champion four times.
 New Zealand Masters Squash Champion five times
 Victorian Masters Squash Champion six times.
 Represented Australia twelve times in World Master’s Team events.

Career as an Administrator
Notwithstanding his outstanding sporting achievements Peter Wright is far better known for his organising and administrative flair and ability. Authoritatively described as “highly regarded throughout world squash as an outstanding sporting administrator”.

For 34 years (1986–2020) he has been –

 President of the Australian Masters Squash Association
 Tournament Director for the 1995 and 2001 World Masters Squash Championships held in Melbourne
 Member of the World Squash Federation Masters Committee for 10 years.
 Executive Committee Member for Squash for the 2006 Commonwealth Games held in Melbourne.
 Tournament Director of the Australian Masters Squash Association and the Victorian Masters Squash Association for 9 years (1983–1992)
 Tournament Director of the Melbourne Cricket Club Squash Club for 15 years. In his 32 years as a member of the squash section, Peter has played 668 competition matches.

Honours
He has engaged in many other significant administrative roles for which he received 
 The Medal of the Order of Australia (OAM) for services to the sport of squash and for a range of executive roles.
 Hans Ebeling Award winner of the Melbourne Cricket Club.
 Life Member of Melbourne Cricket Club Squash section (2006).
 Life Member 1998: Australian Masters Squash Association.
 Legend Status at the Melbourne Cricket Club Squash Section and the Award for outstanding club person of the year.

References 

Australian male squash players
1943 births
Living people
People from Sunshine, Victoria
Sportspeople from Melbourne
Sportsmen from Victoria (Australia)
Australian sports executives and administrators
Recipients of the Medal of the Order of Australia
Commonwealth Games Australia officials